Silver King Peak may also be:

Crystal Mountain (Washington)
Peak 13,762 (Silver King Peak)

See also
Silver Peak (disambiguation)

North American 4000 m summits